The Rajendra Nagar railway station (station code: RJQ) is one of the local railway station in the city of Indore.

Station on famous Delhi–Hyderabad metre-gauge line was founded in the 1970s. Station is equipped with two reservation counters. It was a metre-gauge station but now has been converted into broad-gauge station.

Additionally the station operates in double-track system, however only single track has been used so far. The station is also used as railway yard to park some trains for the busy .

Major trains
The following trains have stoppage at the station.

References

Railway stations in Indore
Ratlam railway division
Railway stations in Indore district
Memorials to Rajendra Prasad
Railway stations opened in the 1970s